This is a list of Epicurean philosophers, ordered (roughly) by date.  See also :Category:Epicurean philosophers.

See also
List of ancient Greek philosophers
List of ancient Platonists
List of Cynic philosophers
List of Stoic philosophers

 
Epicurean philosophers
Epicurean philosophers